Theodore Payne Thurston (June 30, 1867 – January 28, 1941) was the second missionary bishop of Oklahoma in the Episcopal Church between 1919 and 1926.

Early life and education
A son of Benjamin Eaton Thurston and Mary Ann Siddall, Theodore was born in Delavan, Illinois, on June 30, 1867. He was educated at the public schools in Philadelphia, graduating in June 1883 and then from Shattuck School at Faribault, Minnesota, in 1887. He also studied at Trinity College in Hartford, Connecticut, graduating with a Bachelor of Arts in 1891 and awarded a Doctor of Divinity in 1911. He completed his theological studies at the Episcopal Theological School in Cambridge, Massachusetts, in 1894.

Ordained ministry 
Thurston was ordained deacon on June 20, 1894, by Bishop William Lawrence of Massachusetts, in St John's Memorial Chapel, Cambridge, Massachusetts. He was then ordained priest on June 23, 1895, by Bishop Henry Benjamin Whipple at St Paul's Church in St. Paul, Missouri. He initially served as served as rector of St Paul's Church in Owatonna, Minnesota, until 1897 when he moved to Winona, Minnesota, to become rector of St Paul's Church. In 1903 he went to Minneapolis, becoming rector of St Paul's Church where he remained until 1911.

Episcopacy 
Thurston was elected Missionary Bishop of Eastern Oklahoma in 1910 and was consecrated on January 25, 1911, by Presiding Bishop Daniel S. Tuttle. He was the first and only Missionary Bishop of Eastern Oklahoma between 1911 and 1919. The District of Eastern Oklahoma was created on October 11, 1910, and reunited with the District of Oklahoma on October 10, 1919. Upon reunification, Thurston became Missionary Bishop of the combined Eastern and Oklahoma District, while after 1928, the title was changed to Bishop of the Missionary District of Oklahoma. He was considered to be socially liberal and a low churchman like his predecessor. He retained the post until his resignation on October 15, 1926, due to an increasing poor health.

Family
Thurston married Jane Mitchell on September 21, 1904, but she died eight months later on May 14, 1905. On June 8, 1920, he married Daisy Dean Carroll in St Paul's Cathedral.  Daisy was previously married to Milton Hamlin Speer who died in 1906. She died March 23, 1968.

References

1867 births
1941 deaths
People from Delavan, Illinois
People from Owatonna, Minnesota
People from Winona, Minnesota
People from Minneapolis
Episcopal bishops of Oklahoma